Funk & Wagnalls was an American publisher known for its reference works, including A Standard Dictionary of the English Language (1st ed. 1893–5), and the Funk & Wagnalls Standard Encyclopedia (25 volumes, 1st ed. 1912).

The encyclopedia was renamed Funk & Wagnalls New Standard Encyclopedia in 1931 and in 1945, it was known as New Funk & Wagnalls Encyclopedia, Universal Standard Encyclopedia, Funk & Wagnalls Standard Reference Encyclopedia, and Funk & Wagnalls New Encyclopedia (29 volumes, 1st ed. 1971).

The last printing of Funk & Wagnalls New Encyclopedia was in 1997. , annual Yearbooks are still in production.

The I.K. Funk & Company, founded in 1875, was renamed Funk & Wagnalls Company after two years, and later became Funk & Wagnalls Inc., then Funk & Wagnalls Corporation.

History

Isaac Kaufmann Funk founded the business in 1875 as I.K. Funk & Company. In 1877, Adam Willis Wagnalls, one of Funk's classmates at Wittenberg College (now Wittenberg University), joined the firm as a partner and the name of the firm was changed to Funk & Wagnalls Company.

During its early years, Funk & Wagnalls Company published religious books. The publication of The Literary Digest in 1890 marked a shift to publishing of general reference dictionaries and encyclopedias. The firm published The Standard Dictionary of the English Language in 2 volumes in 1893 and 1895, and Funk & Wagnalls Standard Encyclopedia in 1912.

In 1913, the New Standard Unabridged Dictionary of the English Language was published under the supervision of Isaac K. Funk (Editor-in-Chief). The New Standard Unabridged Dictionary was revised until 1943, a later edition that was also supervised by Charles Earl Funk.

The encyclopedia was based upon Chambers's Encyclopaedia:
"Especially are we indebted to the famous Chambers's Encyclopaedia ... With its publishers we have arranged to draw upon its stores as freely as we have found it of advantage so to do."

Wilfred J. Funk, the son of Isaac Funk, was president of the company from 1925 to 1940.

In 1934, Funk & Wagnalls started the Literary Digest Books imprint. It launched with seven titles with up to twenty-five a year intended. The imprint lasted into mid-1935.

Unicorn Press (later known as the Standard Reference Work Publishing Co.) obtained the rights to publish the encyclopedia, and by 1953 that firm began to sell the encyclopedia through a supermarket continuity marketing campaign, encouraging consumers to include the latest volume of the encyclopedia on their shopping lists. Grocery stores in the 1970s in the Midwest (Chicago – Jewel Grocers) typically kept about four volumes in a rotation, dropping the last and adding the latest until all volumes could be acquired with the initial first volume being 99 cents. The first several volumes were gold painted along the edges and the later volumes were not. A volume was typically priced at $2.99, but toward the later volumes the price had increased with the inflation of the 1970s. If one did not go shopping on a weekly basis, or delivery was spotty, there was a good chance that a volume might be missed to complete the set. The encyclopedia was also sold as a mail order set of 36(?) volumes; one volume a month.

Also sold in grocery stores, one volume at a time, was the Family Library Of Great Music, a 22-album series of classical recordings. One famous composer was highlighted in each release. The records were manufactured exclusively for Funk & Wagnalls by RCA Custom.

In 1965, Funk & Wagnalls Co. was sold to Reader's Digest.

In 1971, the company, now Funk and Wagnalls, Incorporated, was sold to Dun & Bradstreet. Dun and Bradstreet retained Funk & Wagnalls New Encyclopedia, but other reference works were relinquished to other publishers.

In 1984, Dun & Bradstreet sold Funk & Wagnalls, Inc., to a group of Funk & Wagnalls executives, who in turn sold it to Field Corporation in 1988.

In 1991, the company was sold to K-III Holdings, Inc, and then in 1993 Funk & Wagnalls Corporation acquired the World Almanac.

In 1998, as part of the Information division of Primedia Inc. (the renamed K-III), the encyclopedia content appeared on the Web site "funkandwagnalls.com". This short-lived venture was shut down in 2001.

Ripplewood Holdings bought Primedia's education division in 1999, which became part of Reader's Digest Association in 2007. In 2009, Funk & Wagnalls was acquired by World Book Encyclopedia.

After failing to purchase rights to the text of the Encyclopædia Britannica and World Book Encyclopedia for its Encarta digital encyclopedia, Microsoft reluctantly used (under license) the text of Funk & Wagnalls encyclopedia for the first editions of its encyclopedia. This licensed text was gradually replaced over the following years with content Microsoft created itself.

Publications
 18?? – The Preacher's Homiletic Commentary on the Old Testament
 18?? – The Preacher's Homiletic Commentary on the New Testament
 1890 – The Literary Digest
 1891 – The Encyclopedia of Missions
 1893–95 – The Standard Dictionary of the English Language
 1901/1906 – The Jewish Encyclopedia, 12 volumes
 1904 - The Works of Edgar Allan Poe, 10 volumes
 1905 — Mrs. Maybrick's Own Story: My Fifteen Lost Years by Florence Maybrick
 1906 – The World's Famous Orations, 10 volume set
 1909 – Standard Bible Dictionary
 1912 – Funk & Wagnalls Standard Encyclopedia
 1913–1943 The New Standard Unabridged Dictionary of the English Language, Two volumes
 1915 – Women of all nations: a record of their characteristics, habits, manners, customs, and influence, Volume 1
 1915 – Women of all nations: a record of their characteristics, habits, manners, customs, and influence, Volume 2
 1915 – Women of all nations: a record of their characteristics, habits, manners, customs, and influence, Volume 3
 1920 – Funk and Wagnall's Student's Standard Dictionary of the English language [Hardcover]
 1927 – The World's One Hundred Best Short Stories, 10 volumes
 1929 – The World's Best 100 Detective Stories, in 10 volumes
 1929 – Pocket Library of the World's Essential Knowledge, 10 volumes
 1929 – The World's 1000 Best Poems, 10 volumes
 1936 – A New Standard Bible Dictionary
 1946 – Funk and Wagnalls New Practical Standard Dictionary, 2 volumes Re-Copyrighted in 1949, 1951, 1952, 1953, 1954 1955 ***First hand account from volumes dated 1955.
 1949/50 – Funk & Wagnalls Standard Dictionary of Folklore, Mythology and Legend, 2 volumes. A one-volume edition with minor revisions was released in 1972.
 1957 – The Fashion Dictionary
 19?? – Funk & Wagnalls Standard Handbook of Synonyms, Antonyms, and Prepositions
 1968 – Handbook of Indoor Games & Stunts [Paperbook F58]
 1971 – Standard Dictionary of the English Language (International Edition)
 19?? – Poetry handbook; a dictionary of terms
 1971 – Funk & Wagnalls New Encyclopedia
 1973 – Funk & Wagnalls Guide to modern world literature
 1974 – Funk & Wagnalls Wildlife Encyclopedia
 1974 – Funk & Wagnalls Standard Desk Dictionary (2nd Edition)
 1980 – The New Funk & Wagnalls Illustrated Wildlife Encyclopedia
 1986 – Funk & Wagnalls New Encyclopedia of Science
 1996 – Funk & Wagnalls World Atlas

In popular culture 
During certain scenes of banter between Dan Rowan and Dick Martin on the NBC comedy-variety show Rowan & Martin's Laugh-In, after a particular anecdote of trivia or wisdom, Dick Martin would close with: "Look that up in your Funk & Wagnalls!" Sales of the dictionary reportedly increased by 30% as a result of this recurring joke.

On "The Tonight Show Starring Johnny Carson", sidekick Ed McMahon would begin each "Carnac the Magnificent" sketch by explaining that the envelopes he would hand to Johnny Carson (in character as "Carnac") had been: “...hermetically sealed in a mayonnaise jar on Funk and Wagnall's porch since noon today!" The envelopes contained questions, to which "Carnac" would divine the answers by reading a script on his desk.

In an episode of South Park (Season 7, Episode 1) entitled "Cancelled", the character Eric Cartman is quoted as saying to his friends Stan, Kyle, and Kenny "What the Funk & Wagnalls are you guys talking about?", as the other boys are discussing a past memory of aliens abducting Cartman, which was a reference to the show's pilot episode.

References

External links
The Wagnalls Memorial Library

American companies established in 1875
Publishing companies established in 1875
American encyclopedias
English-language encyclopedias
Defunct book publishing companies of the United States
Lists of books
20th-century encyclopedias
19th-century encyclopedias